Hypocysta adiante, the orange ringlet, is a species of butterfly of the family Nymphalidae. It is found in Australia, including Queensland, New South Wales, the Northern Territory and the north of Western Australia.

The wingspan is about 30 mm. Adults have orange-brown wings, shading to dark brown at the margins. There is an eyespot on each hindwing. The underside is similar to the upperside, but there are two eyespots on each hindwing.

The larvae feed on various Poaceae species, including Digitaria didactyla, Imperata cylindrica and Themeda triandra. They are pinkish brown with dark longitudinal stripes. They tend to rest on a stem or leaf at the base of their food plant. Full-grown larvae are about 20 mm long. Pupation takes place in a mottled brown pupa which is attached to the food plant.

Subspecies
Hypocysta adiante adiante (Torres Strait Islands, Cape York to Sydney)
Hypocysta adiante antirius Butler, 1868 (Darwin region)

References

Satyrini
Butterflies of Australia
Butterflies described in 1825
Taxa named by Jacob Hübner